Pathbhola is a 1986 Bengali drama action film directed by Tarun Majumdar.

Cast 
 Prosenjit Chatterjee
 Tapas Paul
 Utpal Dutta
 Abhishek Chatterjee
 Sandhya Roy
 Nayna Das
 Shakti Thakur
 Tuhin Bandyopadhyay
 Manju Dey
 Nirmal Kumar
 Haradhan Banerjee
 Arun Mukherjee

Awards 
 National Film Award for Best Audiography - Durga Mitra, Jyoti Prasad Chatterjee

 Bengal Film Journalists' Association – Best Music Director Award - Hemanta Mukherjee

 Bengal Film Journalists' Association – Best Female Playback Award - Sujata Sarkar

References

External links

Bengali-language Indian films
Films directed by Tarun Majumdar
Films scored by Hemant Kumar
1986 films
1980s Bengali-language films
Indian action drama films
1980s action drama films
1986 drama films